Love Letter for Starla is a 2017 Indonesian drama film produced by Screenplay Films & Legacy Pictures. The film stars Jefri Nichol & Caitlin Halderman. The title of the movie comes from the song’s title by Virgoun, which is also the song of this movie.

Plot 
It is about Hema, a guy who is obsessed in living his life with nature (Jefri Nichol). Because of his overwhelming love of nature, he eventually wrote a love letter to nature. From there Hema then thought to create a graffiti or mural with the help of an ancient typewriter, which was passed down from his ancestors who was a former journalist. The intention to make the mural was from his love of the universe. Inadvertently, one day Hema met  a girl called Starla (Caitlin Halderman). Starla was an elegant, graceful girl who instantly melted his heart for the first time within six hours after meeting her. Upon reflection, he realizes that there is a much more beautiful love letter than a love letter for nature, and that is the Love Letter for Starla.

But when Starla and Hema's relationship got closer, suddenly something strange and changed in Starla. Starla, who had been nice before, began to move away and was often angry. She also tried to stay away from Hema, even telling him to forget all their love stories. Their love story became popular in social media. Even the love story has also been broadcast on a radio by a friend named Hema named Athena who worked as a radio announcer.

After a while Hema gradually learned that Starla's revelation knew herself. Apparently after Starla investigated away from him that is about the past of his family.

Cast
Jefri Nichol as Hema Chandra
Caitlin Halderman as Starla

References

External links
 

2017 films
Indonesian drama films
2010s Indonesian-language films
Films directed by Rudi Aryanto
2017 drama films